Ivo Mahlknecht (21 May 1939 – 30 March 2020) was an Italian alpine skier. He competed at the 1964 and 1968 Winter Olympics in the downhill, slalom and giant slalom events with the best result of sixth place in the downhill in 1968.

Mahlknecht died of COVID-19 on 30 March 2020.

References

External links
 

1939 births
2020 deaths
Italian male alpine skiers
Olympic alpine skiers of Italy
Alpine skiers at the 1964 Winter Olympics
Alpine skiers at the 1968 Winter Olympics
People from Urtijëi
Germanophone Italian people
Deaths from the COVID-19 pandemic in Trentino-Alto Adige/Südtirol
Sportspeople from Südtirol
Italian alpine skiing coaches